In cosmology, Gurzadyan theorem, proved by Vahe Gurzadyan, states the most general functional form for the force satisfying the condition of identity of the gravity of the sphere and of a point mass located in the sphere's center. This theorem thus refers to the first statement of Isaac Newton’s  shell theorem (the identity mentioned above) but not the second one, namely, the absence of gravitational force inside a shell.

The theorem had entered, for example, in physics manual website and its importance for cosmology outlined in several papers   as well as in shell theorem.

The formula and the cosmological constant 
The formula for the force derived in   has the form

The first term is the familiar law of universal gravitation, the second one corresponds to the cosmological constant term in general relativity and McCrea-Milne cosmology.
Then the field is force-free only in the center of a shell but the confinement (oscillator) term does not change the initial  symmetry of the Newtonian field.

Consequences: cosmological constant as a physical constant  

Einstein named the cosmological constant as a universal constant, introducing it to define the static cosmological model.

From this theorem the cosmological constant  emerges as additional constant of gravity along with the Newton’s gravitational constant . Then, the cosmological constant is dimension independent and matter-uncoupled and hence can be considered even more universal than Newton’s gravitational constant.

For  joining the set of fundamental constants , the gravitational
Newton’s constant, the speed of light and the Planck constant, yields

and a dimensionless quantity emerges for the 4-constant set 

where  is a real number. Note, no dimensionless quantity is possible to construct from the 3 constants .

This within a numerical factor, coincides  with the information (or entropy) of de Sitter event horizon 

and the Bekenstein Bound

Rescaling of physical constants 

Then the ratio yields 

for all physical quantities in Planck (initial) and de Sitter (final)  eras of the aeons, remaining invariant under conformal transformations.

Observational indications 
The dynamics of groups and clusters of galaxies are claimed to fit that formula, see also.
The possibility of two Hubble flows, a local one, determined by that formula, and a global one, described by Friedmannian cosmological equations was stated in.

References 

Gravity
Physics theorems
Mathematical theorems